Charles Pearcy Mountford OBE (8 May 189016 November 1976) was an Australian anthropologist and photographer. He is known for his pioneering work on Indigenous Australians and his depictions and descriptions of their art. He also led the American-Australian Scientific Expedition to Arnhem Land. His final book, Nomads of the Australian Desert, was the subject of an important court case due to its inclusion of culturally restricted content.

Nomads of the Australian Desert 
Mountford's final book Nomads of the Australian Desert (1976) contained details and pictures of secret ceremonies that had been revealed to Mountford in confidence during his fieldwork in the 1930s and 1940s. Members of the Pitjantjara Council swiftly launched legal action and sought an ex parte injunction preventing the book's publication in the Northern Territory. They argued that the Pitjantjara men who had revealed culturally restricted information with Mountford did so on the understanding that he would not share it with women, children, or uninitiated Aboriginal men.

The plaintiffs were successful, and judge Justice Muirhead agreed to grant the injunction. He concluded that a number of photographs, drawings and descriptions of persons, places and ceremonies featured in the book held deep religious and cultural significance to the plaintiffs, and that their publication could harm the community.

Although this injunction only applied to the Northern Territory, the book's publishers ultimately decided to withdraw the book from sale everywhere.

Foster v Mountford was the first of several Australian court cases dealing with Aboriginal secret information.

Legacy 
There is a collection of his photographs, journals, sound recordings and other works created, written and gathered by Mountford in the State Library of South Australia, known as the Mountford-Sheard Collection, which has been inscribed on UNESCO's Memory of the World. It is of great cultural significance to Aboriginal Australians, particularly those in central Australia, the Flinders Ranges (Adnyamathanha people), Arnhem Land (Yolngu people) and the Tiwi Islands (Tiwi people), and the material is respectful of the people whose lives it documents. Mountford's articles on allied subjects were published in The Bulletin, Walkabout, Pacific Islands Monthly, Australasian Photo-Review and others now digitised and publicly accessible at the National Library of Australia.

Works

 The Art of Albert Namatjira (1944)
 Brown Men and Red Sand (1948)
 Australian tree portraits (1956)
 Records of the American-Australian scientific expedition to Arnhem Land: Vol. 1 Art, myth and symbolism (1956)
 The Tiwi: their art, myth and ceremony (1958)
 Ayers Rock, its people, their beliefs and their art (1965) – his M.A. thesis which became a popular paperback
 The Dreamtime (1965), The Dawn of Time (1969), and The First Sunrise (1971) – in collaboration with artist Ainslie Roberts
 Winbaraku: and the myth of Jarapiri (1967)
 Australian Aboriginal portraits (1967)
 The Aborigines and their country (1969)
 Nomads of the Australian Desert (1976) – withdrawn after sale for cultural reasons

References

External links
 Bright Sparcs Biographical entry
 Mountford-Sheard Collection of the State Library of South Australia
 State Library of South Australia: SA Memory page

1890 births
1976 deaths
Australian anthropologists
Australian photographers
Place of death missing
20th-century anthropologists
Memory of the World Register in Australia